The 2018 Turkish Women's Cup was the second edition of the Turkish Women's Cup, an invitational women's football tournament held annually in Turkey. It took place from 27 February to 7 March 2018.

Format
The twelve invited teams were split into three groups to play a round-robin tournament. Points awarded in the group stage follow the standard formula of three points for a win, one point for a draw and zero points for a loss. In the case of two teams being tied on the same number of points in a group, their head-to-head result determine the higher place.

Teams

Squads

Kosovo

Coach:  Afërdita Fazlija

Notes
GUE = Guest player.

Group stage
The groups and schedule were announced on 22 February 2018.

Group A

Group B

Group C

Additional matches

Ranking of teams for placement matches

Placement matches

Ninth place game

Seventh place game

Fifth place game

Third place game

Final

Goalscorers

References

2018 in women's association football
Women's Cup
February 2018 sports events in Turkey
March 2018 sports events in Turkey
2018
Sport in Antalya
2018 in Turkish women's sport